Znojile is a settlement in the hills north of the Zagorje ob Savi in central Slovenia. The area is part of the traditional region of Upper Carniola. It is now included with the rest of the Municipality of Zagorje ob Savi in the Central Sava Statistical Region.

Name
The name Znojile is derived from *znoji(d)lo 'sunny or sun-facing area' from the verb *znojiti 'to be warmed by the sun'. The name therefore refers to the geographical orientation of the place.

Church
The local church, built on a hill northeast of the settlement, is dedicated to Saint Leonard. It is a Gothic building that was restyled in the Baroque in the mid-18th century.

References

External links
Znojile on Geopedia

Populated places in the Municipality of Zagorje ob Savi